Lanchkhuti is a city in western Georgian region of Guria. It has a population of about 8,000.

Lanchkhuti received city status in 1961. Under the USSR, it was the centre of the Georgian SSR Lanchkhuti area and today continues to serve as the capital of the eponymous district within the Guria region.

Lanchkhuti is an industrial town with a tea processing factory, cannery, meat and dairy factory and a brick and tile factory. The town is served by a railway station on the Samtredia-Batumi line.

International relations

Twin towns — Sister cities
  Cody, Wyoming, United States
  Kupiškis District Municipality, Lithuania

Sports
The local football club is FC Guria Lanchkhuti, who play their home games at the Evgrapi Shevardnadze Stadium. They played one season in the Soviet Top League and won the 1990 Georgian Cup.

See also
 Guria

References

Cities and towns in Guria
Kutaisi Governorate
Populated places in Lanchkhuti Municipality